Agent J is the ninth studio album by Taiwanese singer Jolin Tsai. It was released on September 21, 2007, by EMI and Mars. It was produced by Lars Quang, Nik Quang, RnG, Adia, Paul Lee, Michael Lin, Paula Ma, and Jamie Hsueh. It was released alongside the film under the same name, which was directed by Jeff Chang, Marlboro Lai, and Kuang Sheng, and it features Kim Jae-won, Stephen Fung, and Carl Ng.

It received mixed reviews from music critics, who commented that it retained Tsai's adventurous way and diverse musical styles, but lacked freshness and melodicity. It sold more than 3 million copies in Asia. In Taiwan, it sold more than 200,000 copies, becoming the year's highest-selling album. Adia won a Golden Melody Award for Best Single Producer for "Agent J", and Andrew Chen won a Golden Melody Award for Best Music Arrangement for the same track.

Background and development 

On May 12, 2006, Tsai released her eighth studio album, Dancing Diva, which sold more than 2.5 million copies in Asia. In Taiwan, it sold more than 300,000 copies, becoming the year's highest-selling album. It was nominated a Golden Melody Award for Best Mandarin Album, she was nominated for Best Female Mandarin Singer, and Adia was nominated for Best Single Producer for "Dancing Diva". Eventually, she won Golden Melody Awards for Best Female Mandarin Singer and Favorite Female Singer/Group. Additionally, "Marry Me Today" which sung with David Tao won Song of the Year.

On December 12, 2006, she revealed that she would begin to prepare for her new album in January 2007. On January 13, 2007, she went to London, England for the three-week voice and dance courses. On May 22, 2007, she went to Helsingør, Denmark for a week of recording session for the album. Meanwhile, it was revealed that the album would be released in August or September 2007. It was also revealed that Lars Quang, who worked with Tsai on Dancing Diva, wrote another three songs for this album. On June 2, 2007, it was revealed that she had finished recording the album and she has been to London, England to attend a ten-day dance course. On June 8, 2007, she performed "Let's Move It" on a promotional event of Toyota, and it was later included on the album. Meanwhile, Toyota announced that they would hold a dance competition on July 15, 2007, where the winner would appear in a music video of the album.

On July 9, 2007, it was revealed that Tsai and Kim Jae-won filmed a music video of the album in Paris, France. On August 8, 2007, it was revealed that EMI spent a total of NT$50 million to film an 80-minute film of the same name. The film was divided into three chapters, which were filmed in Paris, London, and Bangkok with Kim Jae-won, Stephen Fung, and Carl Ng, respectively. On September 4, 2007, it was revealed that the album would feature four songs written by Malaysian musicians—"Agent J", "Alone", "Ideal State", and "Priceless". On September 11, 2007, all of the songs from the album were leaked, Sam Chen, the general manager of EMI Greater China, said: "IFPI Taiwan has asked the police to deal with the case. Once caught, any upload, download, exchange, IFPI will pursue legal liability, and will not settle." Tsai said, "I spent more than one year and worked so hard on this album. It makes me sad that cannot arouse people's respect for intellectual property rights."

Writing and recording 
"Agent J" is a heavily rhythmic dance song, and the sound of high heels at the beginning makes the song full of dramatic picture sense. "Bravo Lover" is the Chinese version of Infernal's "Keen on Disco", and it is a house music song. The mandolin sound at the beginning of "Alone" highlights the lonely atmosphere and helplessness. "Sun Will Never Set" is a sweet retro song, and it is the Chinese version of BWO's "Sunshine in the Rain". "Tacit Violence" is a hip-hop, R&B dance song with lyrics about how to use psychological violence against controlling boys. "Priceless" is a R&B song with strong urban contemporary music element.

"Ideal State" is a light mid-tempo song. "Let's Move It" shows boundless music power based on bass drum. "Fear-Free" is a swing 3/4 ballad, the clear and pure piano sound leads the audience slowly into the warm mood of missing. The lyrics of "Metronome" was written by Tsai and reflect a strong and competitive heart, while the piano and chords show a slightly sad mood. "Golden Triangle" combined wind and percussion, leading the audience to explore the mystery and weirdness of love.

Title and artwork 
On the cover of the album's standard edition, Tsai wore a black low-cut leather jacket and boots designed by Natsuko Kawabe. Tsai also debuted a sleek, side-parted short hairstyle.

Release and promotion 

On August 12, 2007, EMI released a trailer of the album. On August 29, 2007, the album was available for pre-order at all 7-Eleven stores in Taiwan. On September 5, 2007, it was available for pre-order on the Taiwanese online shopping website PChome eBay. On September 7, 2007, it was available for pre-order at all record stores in Taiwan. On September 15, 2007, EMI announced that more than 80,000 copies had been pre-ordered in Taiwan within the first week. On September 28, 2007, it topped the weekly album sales charts of G-Music and Five Music. On October 2, 2007, EMI announced that the album had sold more than 150,000 copies in Taiwan. On October 21, 2007, Tsai held the Agent J Concert in Tamsui, Taiwan.

On October 26, 2007, EMI released the champion spacial edition of the album, which additionally includes 10 music videos, 4 dance videos, and one remixed version of "Bravo Lover". On December 7, 2007, EMI released the special celebration edition of the album. This edition additionally includes the video of the Agent J Concert and the music video of "Let's Move It". On January 4, 2008, Five Music announced that the album topped the year-end album sales chart of 2007. On January 11, 2008, G-Music announced that it topped the year-end album sales chart of 2007.

Live performances 
On September 24, 2007, Tsai participated in the Hito Mid-Autumn Concert and performed "Bravo Lover" and "Fear-Free". On October 24, 2007, she attended the opening ceremony of the 16th Golden Rooster and Hundred Flowers Film Festival and performed "Agent J". On December 26, 2007, she participated in the 2007 Metro Radio Hits Music Awards and performed "Agent J" and "Fear-Free". On December 31, 2007, she participated in the New Year's Eve Concert in Taichung, Taiwan, where she performed "Agent J", "Alone", and "Sun Will Never Set". On the same day, she participated in the New Year's Eve Concert in Taipei, Taiwan and performed "Tacit Violence", "Fear-Free", and "Sun Will Never Set". On January 9, 2008, she participated in the Zhejiang TV television show Sing 2008, where she performed "Bravo Lover". On January 10, 2008, she participated in the Southeast TV television show Love from the Strait and performed "Agent J", "Alone", "Ideal State", "Sun Will Never Set", "Fear-Free", and "Bravo Lover".

On January 11, 2008, she attended the M Conference, where she performed "Sun Will Never Set" and "Agent J". On January 13, 2008, she participated in the 2nd Migu Music Awards and performed "Agent J" and "Bravo Lover". On January 23, 2008, she participated in the 2007 Beijing Pop Music Awards and performed "Agent J". On March 1, 2008, she attended the 2008 Hito Music Awards and performed "Agent J", "Bravo Lover", and "Sun Will Never Set". On April 7, 2008, she participated in the 2007 Music Radio China Top Chart Awards and performed "Agent J". On April 8, 2008, she participated in the CCTV television show The Same Song and performed "Agent J" and "Sun Will Never Set". On April 28, 2008, she participated in the opening ceremony of the 4th China International Cartoon & Animation Festival and performed "Sun Will Never Set". Since then, Tsai has participated in various events and performed songs from the album.

Singles and music videos 

On August 29, 2007, Tsai released the single, "Agent J". On September 3, 2007, she released the music video of "Agent J", which was directed by Jeff Chang. She performed aerial silk and pole dance in the music video, and she said: "After practicing for a few days, because I am right-handed, my right side has a feeling of being crippled! The props of these two dances are either soft or hard, both of which need to perform rotating moves in the air. The aerial silk is to learn the feeling of being integrated, but the pole is hard, which cannot be relied on brute force, so we need to learn how to control it!" On September 15, 2007, she released the music video of "Fear-Free", which was directed by Jeff Chang. On September 17, 2007, she released the music video of "Bravo Lover", which was directed by Marlboro Lai. On October 1, 2007, she released the music video of "Alone", which was directed by Jeff Chang.

On October 10, 2007, she released the music video of "Sun Will Never Set", which was directed by Marlboro Lai. On October 24, 2007, she released the music video of "Tacit Violence", which was directed by Kuang Sheng. On November 5, 2007, she released the music video of "Priceless", which was directed by Kuang Sheng. On November 29, 2007, she released the music video of "Ideal State", which was directed by Marlboro Lai, the music video of "Golden Triangle", which was directed by Kuang Sheng, and the music video of "Metronome", which was directed by Marlboro Lai. On December 6, 2007, she released the music video of "Let's Move It", which was directed by Marlboro Lai. "Agent J" reached number 14 on the 2007 Hit FM Top 100 Singles of the Year chart, and "Sun Will Never Set" and "Bravo Lover" reached number one and number 41 on the chart, respectively.

Critical reception 
Sina Music's Stephen Lee commented: "The new album Agent J continued Jolin's adventurous style. She also attempted a variety of musical styles and elements on the album, tried a variety of styles of dance music and ballad. Personally, I think the quality of these songs on the album is quite good, and meets the taste and requirement of Taiwanese music fans. To be fair, although the surprise in the album is not bigger than that in Magic, Castle, and other albums, but a number of works is not depressed, nor old-fashioned, and they can highlight the sexy, passionate characteristics of Jolin more than the past, and the lyrics also successfully describe the modern female attitude, some songs are also quite attractive, there's a lot to be appreciated. As for Jolin's singing skills, they are still ideal after all, her voice has a high degree of recognition, and her emotional processing is also well done, but she still needs to pay attention to the pronunciation, enunciation, and other issues, she needs to sing clearly to improve the texture and power of the song. I don't think this is Jolin's best album in recent years, but it is certainly a work that can be carefully noted." MTV Mandarin commented: "Overall, the ballads on Agent J are better than the dance songs. Jolin Tsai's mastery and proficiency of ballads are very progressive, but the performance of dance music seems to be more focused on the gorgeous appearances and physical skills, we saw Jolin Tsai's efforts on the body. In addition, the coolness of agent is softened in the moving ballads. It is a surprise that these ballads sound very different from the essence of 'agent'. Compared with the quick and decisive agent look in the film, these ballads seem to be more suitable to be put in Lust, Caution and to be sang eloquently." ERC Chinese Top Ten's DJ Luo Yi commented: "It maintained the overall standard of Dancing Diva, this time the never-disappointing Jolin Tsai focused on dance songs and brought refreshing tracks—dance songs integrated both fashion and retro elements, not boring or old-fashioned", and added: "Because of maintaining the standard, there are no more elements than those in Dancing Diva. The characteristics of hard work often belongs to untalented singers, who will not boldly deviate from the need of the mainstream market, but just contribute more popular songs for fans to entertain themselves in karaoke. The lyrics are a bit weak, and a few lyrics are obviously piled up for creativity."

Chinese musician Qu Shicong commented: "The overall music production is at a very good level, Danish producers brought three relatively fresh songs, especially the promotional song 'Let's Move It'. I appreciate it more", he added: "These songs are not as good as those on Dancing Diva, mainly because the sense of melody is relatively weak. The two songs produced by Paul Lee are also not good, and they do not have the 'energy' that Jolin Tsai should have." Keith Chan commented: "Jolin's packaging is always dazzling, and this album is no exception. Some people say that her image is like Taiwan's Ayumi Hamasaki, but I think Ayumi Hamasaki is Japan's Jolin Tsai in terms of dancing skills", he added: "Dance songs and ballads are polarized, there is a lack of mid-tempo and other types of songs, and the structure is a bit dull.” Tencent Entertainment's Shuwa commented: "The image is set as an agent, and most of the songs on Agent J are close to the image in temperament. However, in terms of auditory effect, the dance songs on Agent J are not as fast and profound as those on Dancing Diva, but in terms of detail processing, they are better than before. The eye-catching retro disco style is not Jolin Tsai's first attempt, but this time the music arrangement is bolder. And the mid-tempo songs and ballads inherited the mature temperament of Dancing Diva, there is not much freshness in the sense of listening. On the contrary, Jolin Tsai's first film related to Agent J is more attractive, so even in the music video promotion, the music videos edited from the film account for the majority. In terms of producers, Lars Quang, Nik Quang, and RnG are first-time collaborations, the three songs they contributed lack a sense of bounce in terms of dance music, but the melody and music arrangement are very exciting."

ERC Chinese Top Ten's DJ Li Xin commented: "It's still a collaboration with Adia, and it's still similar dance songs and ballads. In fact, the most attractive thing about Jolin Tsai's album is her performance and hard work, especially the music video, she is full of spirit of hard work, so this is worthy of praise", he added: "The songs are very average, and they sound the same as before, and there are fewer songs like 'The Spirit of Knight', 'Magic', and 'Dancing Diva', which have unforgettable melodies." Global Chinese Music Chart's DJ Zhu Yun commented: "The overall album is fancy and lively. On this basis, the song level is relatively average. There are no surprises, but it may not be a step back for fans who like her", he added: "This time the two lead songs are not good. 'Agent J' has nothing special, it seems to want to change a bit but it didn't go well. 'Bravo Lover' is also a failure, and the retro feeling has not come out at all." Sina Entertainment's KeEr Qinfu commented: "It's still a record that cost a lot of money. Unfortunately, I personally like the love ballads more than the dance songs that cost more money. It is also worth mentioning that Jolin Tsai tried to be independent to write the lyrics of 'Metronome', the level is still OK", he added: "The overall freshness of the songs, whether dance songs or ballads, is weak, and you can hear the shadow of many hit songs. In addition, the lyrics of the dance songs are mostly boring." Sina Entertainment commented: "Jolin Tsai is still the same Jolin Tsai, hard working and diligent, willing to work hard for some gimmicks that do not belong to the music itself, such as music videos and dance moves. Her diligent effort in gimmicks has attracted a large number of fans and created the current trend idol, but it also made Jolin Tsai, who had a very high standard of songs on Magic, disappear. The same is true for this album, the music is fashionable and fancy, the music video performance is amazing, the dance is dazzling, but other than the works of Danish musicians, there is no freshness, the melody is weak, and the song structure is relatively dull. The overall level is not as good as the previous Dancing Diva. Although this direction is commercially strong, it is not a long-term solution. To make a breakthrough, in addition to work hard, should be the right way.”

Accolades 
On December 16, 2007, the music video of "Agent J" won a TVB8 Mandarin Music On Demand Award for Best Music Video Performance. On December 26, 2007, she won Metro Radio Hits Music Awards for Best Asian Female Singer and Favorite Singer, and "Agent J" won Top Songs (Mandarin). On January 12, 2008, she won Baidu Boiling Point Awards for Most Searched Female Singer and Top 3 Favorite Female Singers. On January 13, 2008, Tsai won a Migu Music Award for Top Selling Female Singer. On January 14, 2008, "Sun Will Never Set" won a Canadian Chinese Pop Music Chart Award for Top 10 Songs (Mandarin). On January 23, 2008, she won a Beijing Pop Music Award for Favorite Female Singer (Hong Kong/Taiwan), and "Sun Will Never Set" won Top Songs. On January 31, 2008, she won KKBox Music Awards for Best Female Singer and Top 10 Singers. On February 28, 2008, she won Family Music Awards for Top 10 Singers and Best Dance Song Performance, and the album won Top 10 Albums. On March 1, 2008, she won a Hito Music Award for Best Female Singer, the album won Most Weeks on Chart Album, and "Sun Will Never Set" won Top 10 Songs and Favorite Song.

On March 11, 2008, she won a Music Pioneer Award for Favorite Female Singer. On April 8, 2008, the music video of "Agent J" won a Top Chinese Music Award for Best Music Video. On April 12, 2008, she won Music Radio China Top Chart Awards for Top Selling Female Singer and Best All-Round Artist (Hong Kong/Taiwan), and "Agent J" won Top Songs (Hong Kong/Taiwan). On June 14, 2008, she was nominated an MTV Asia Award for Favorite Artist Taiwan. On July 5, 2008, Adia won a Golden Melody Award for Best Single Producer for "Agent J", and Andrew Chen won Best Music Arrangement for the same track. On October 25, 2008, she won a Singapore Hits Award for Asia Media Award (Female). On October 30, 2008, she won Global Chinese Music Awards for Favorite Female Singer, Top 5 Favorite Female Singers, Best Stage Performance, and Top Singer (Taiwan), and "Sun Will Never Set" won Top 20 Songs. On November 16, 2008, she won a CCTV-MTV Music Award for Favorite Female Singer (Taiwan). On December 15, 2008, she won a Tencent Stars Award for Top Female Singer (Hong Kong/Taiwan).

Track listing

Release history

References

External links 
 
 

2007 albums
EMI Music Taiwan albums
Jolin Tsai albums